Richard Firth Green is a Canadian scholar who specializes in Middle English literature. He is a Humanities Distinguished Professor of English Emeritus at Ohio State University and author of three monographs on the social life, law, and literature of the late Middle English period.

Green's first book, Poets and Princepleasers: Literature and the English Court in the Late Middle Ages, studies "business of reading and writing at court", as "a social and a literary history" of the life of men of letters at the English courts of the fourteenth and fifteenth centuries. One of the points argued in the book is that an appointment as court poet also involved important administrative responsibilities, which could be more important than producing poetry: "he was a civil servant first and a poet second". His second book is A Crisis of Truth: Literature and Law in Ricardian England (1998), which Derek Pearsall praised in 2004 as "the best book that has been written on medieval English literature in the last ten years". In A Crisis of Truth, a "monumental, encyclopedic volume", Green analyzes the shift in the meaning of the word and concept of truth during the reign of Richard II of England; this transformation changes "an ethical truth in which truth is understood to reside in persons transforms...into a political truth in which truth is understood to reside in documents" or, in Pearsall's summary, from a subjective to an objective concept.

Books authored
Poets and Princepleasers: Literature and the English Court in the Late Middle Ages (1980)
A Crisis of Truth: Literature and Law in Ricardian England (U of Pennsylvania P, 1998; repr. 2002)
Elf Queens and Holy Friars: Fairy Beliefs and the Medieval Church (U of Pennsylvania P, 2016)

References

External links
Green at OSU

Canadian expatriate academics in the United States
Canadian medievalists
Canadian literary critics
Literary critics of English
Living people
American medievalists
Ohio State University faculty
Year of birth missing (living people)